Scott Reynolds may refer to:
Scott Reynolds (singer), punk rock vocalist with the band All from 1989-1993
Scott Reynolds (writer), television writer